Eldon Garnet (born 1946) is a multidisciplinary artist and novelist based in Toronto, Ontario and a professor at the Ontario College of Art and Design. From 1975 to 1990 he was the editor of Impulse, a Canadian magazine of art and culture.

Career 
Garnet was born in Toronto, Ontario. His first solo show was in Toronto at A Space in 1975. Surveys of Garnet's sculptures and photographic work have been held at the National Gallery of Canada, the Museum of Contemporary Canadian Art and the Amsterdam Center of Photography. His first novel, Reading Brooke Shields: The Garden of Failure was published by Semiotext(e), in 1995. Impulse Archaeology, a collection of articles from his years as editor at Impulse magazine (1975-1990), was released by the University of Toronto Press in 2005. His novel "Lost Between The Edges" was published by Semiotext(e), MIT. His recent novel, Categories of Disappearance is available from impulseb.com. He is also known for his public art works including Memorial to Commemorate the Chinese Railroad Workers in Canada are located in Toronto. Eldon is represented by the Christopher Cutts Gallery Toronto and Torch Gallery, Amsterdam.

External links

References

1953 births
Living people
Artists from Toronto
Canadian male novelists
Canadian photographers
Canadian sculptors
Writers from Toronto